Snefrid Erika Aukland (née Kjølstad, October 5, 1884 – January 14, 1977) was a Norwegian actress.

Family
Snefrid Aukland was the daughter of the orthopedist and lawyer Thorvald Nils Gotfrid Essendrop Kjølstad (1832–1910) and the actress Elly Kjølstad (1850–1930). She was the niece of the actress Mathilde Nielsen. She was married to the engineer Ernst Bernhard Aukland (1894–1969). She also performed under the names Erika Warnecke and Snefrid Warnecke.

Acting career
Snefrid Aukland took part in the National Touring Theater, a troupe led by the theater manager Ludovica Levy, from 1907 to 1911. From 1913 to 1917, she worked at the Norwegian Theater. In 1917, she sailed on SS Bergensfjord to New York City to seek her fortune. At the time, she was registered as an extra living in Kongsberg. She later returned to Norway. In the fall of 1931 she took part in the Chat Noir revue, under the direction of Victor Bernau, and in the 1930s she was on several tours with Bjørn Bjørnevik's theatre, where she performed in the plays Augustas lille feiltrinn (1935) and No'n er gifte – og andre har det godt (1939).

Aukland appeared in several Norwegian films. She made her film debut in 1928 in Ragnar Westfelt's Viddenes folk, and she also appeared in the first Norwegian sound film, Den store barnedåpen, in 1931.

For many years, Aukland  was a prompter and a prop assistant at the National Theater in Oslo, where she was nicknamed Føyka.

Modeling
Snefrid Aukland was one of the first models for the painter Henrik Sørensen, and she is portrayed, among other works, in his painting Artister (Performers) in the Rasmus Meyer art collection in Bergen.

Selected theater roles
The old hag in Tyrihans by Hulda Garborg (Norwegian Theater, 1914)
Krestna in Ungen by Oskar Braaten (Norwegian Theater, 1915)
Anna in Per Olsen og Kjerringa hans (Outdoor Theater at Bygdøy, 1926)
Mrs. Vom in the children's comedy Knold og Tot by Knut Hergel (Oslo Theater, 1927)
Augusta in Augustas lilla felsteg (Norwegian ttile: Augustas lille feiltrinn) by Siegfried Fischer (Bjørnevik Theater, 1935)

Filmography
1928: Viddenes folk as a sorceress
1931: Den store barnedåpen as a woman
1942: Trysil-Knut as an old woman
1944: Ti gutter og en gjente as a hoarder
1951: Storfolk og småfolk as a woman in the village

References

External links
 
 Snefrid Aukland at Sceneweb
 Snefrid Aukland at the Swedish Film Database

1884 births
1977 deaths
20th-century Norwegian actresses
Actresses from Oslo
Aukland family